The 1959–60 Bulgarian Cup was the 20th season of the Bulgarian Cup (in this period the tournament was named Cup of the Soviet Army). Septemvri Sofia won the competition, beating Lokomotiv Plovdiv 4–3 after extra time in the final at the Vasil Levski National Stadium.

First round

|}
1Slavia qualified by drawing of lots.

Second round

|}
1Lokomotiv qualified by drawing of lots.
2Tundzha qualified by drawing of lots.

Quarter-finals

|}

Semi-finals

|}
1Lokomotiv qualified by drawing of lots.

Final

Details

References

1959-60
1959–60 domestic association football cups
Cup